Saint John's Eve, starting at sunset on 23 June, is the eve of celebration before the Feast Day of Saint John the Baptist. The Gospel of Luke (Luke 1:26–37, 56–57) states that John was born six months before Jesus; therefore, the feast of John the Baptist was fixed on 24 June, six months before Christmas according to the old Roman calculation (ante diem VIII Kalendas Iulias). This feast day is one of the very few saints' days which commemorates the anniversary of the birth, rather than the death, of the saint being honored.

The Feast of Saint John closely coincides with the June solstice, also referred to as Midsummer in the Northern Hemisphere. The Christian holy day is fixed at 24 June; but in most countries festivities are mostly held the night before, on Saint John's Eve. This holiday is celebrated in many places.

History

Saint John's Day, the feast day of Saint John the Baptist, was established by the undivided Christian Church in the 4th century A.D., in honour of the birth of the Saint John the Baptist, which the Christian Bible records as being six months before Jesus. As the Western Christian Churches mark the birth of Jesus on December 25, Christmas, the Feast of Saint John (Saint John's Day) was established exactly six months earlier. 

Within Christian theology, this carries significance as John the Baptist "was understood to be preparing the way for Jesus", with  stating, "He must increase, but I must decrease"; this is symbolized in the fact that the "sun begins to diminish at the summer solstice and eventually increases at the winter solstice." By the 6th century A.D., several churches were dedicated in the honour of Saint John the Baptist and a vigil, Saint John's Eve, was added to the feast day of Saint John the Baptist, with Christian priests holding three Masses in churches for the celebration.

In Florence, medieval midsummer celebrations were "an occasion for dramatic representations of the Baptist's life and death" and "the feast day was marked by processions, banquets, and plays, culminating in a fireworks show that the entire city attended." The historian Ronald Hutton states that the "lighting of festive fires upon St. John's Eve is first recorded as a popular custom by Jean Belethus, a theologian at the University of Paris, in the early twelfth century". In England, the earliest reference to this custom occurs on in the 13th century A.D., in the Liber Memorandum of the parish church at Barnwell in the Nene Valley, which stated that parish youth would gather on the day to sing songs and play games. A Christian monk of Lilleshall Abbey, in the 15th century, wrote:

In the 16th century A.D., the historian John Stow, described the celebration of Saint John's Day:

These fires (commonly called Saint John's Fires in various languages) were bonfires that were lit in honour of St. John on Saint John's Eve and Saint John's Day, and served to repel witches and evil spirits. Saint John's Day is also a popular day for infant baptisms and in the 19th century, "baptisms of children who had died 'pagans' were acted out". In Sweden, young people visited holy springs as "a reminder of how John the Baptist baptised Christ in the River Jordan." In addition, historically, "it was a custom to carry lighted torches on Midsummer-eve, as an emblem of St. John the Baptist, who was 'a burning and shining light,' and the preparer of the way of Christ." On Saint John's Eve, goatsbeard and masterwort were fashioned into a cross and then were taken to one's local church, where they were blessed by a Christian priest. Today, common Saint John's Eve and Saint John's Day traditions include processions, church services, Saint John's bonfires, fireworks, and feasting.

Symbolic elements

Fire
Fire is the most typical element associated with the Saint John's Eve celebration. In many countries, such as Croatia, bonfires are lit on the evening of 23 June for people to jump over.

 In Croatia, the feast is called Ivanje (Ivan being Croatian for John). It is celebrated on June 23, mostly in rural areas. Festivals celebrating Ivanje are held across the country. According to the tradition, bonfires (Ivanjski krijesovi) are built on the shores of lakes, near rivers or on the beaches for the young people to jump over the flames.
 The Danes often meet with family and friends to have dinner together. If the weather is good, they then proceed to a local bonfire venue. Here the bonfire with the  effigy of a witch on top is lit around 10 pm. Beforehand, a bonfire speech is often made, at large events normally by a well-known person. According to popular belief, St John's Eve was charged with a special power where evil forces were also at work. People believed that the witches flew past on their broomsticks on their way to the Brocken. To keep the evil forces away, the bonfires were usually lit on high ground. Placing a witch – made of old clothes stuffed with hay – on the bonfire is a tradition which did not become common until the 20th century.
 In some rural parts of Ireland, particularly in the north-west, Bonfire Night is held on St. John's Eve, when bonfires are lit on hilltops. Many towns and cities have "Midsummer Carnivals", with fairs, concerts and fireworks, around the same time. In County Cork in southwest Ireland & County Louth in Northeast Ireland the night is commonly referred to as bonfire night and is among the busiest nights of the year for the fire services.

Medicinal plants
Traditionally, women collect several species of plants on St. John's eve. These vary from area to area, but mostly include fennel, rue, rosemary, lemon verbena, mallows, laburnum, foxgloves and elder flowers. On the Feast of St. John, it is customary to gather the perennial herb "St. John's Wort". Since medieval times, the herb has been hung over doors, windows and icons to keep witches and evil spirits away. It is also used medicinally, and was used thus by the Knights Hospitaller. In some areas, they are dipped in a vessel with water and left outside, exposed to the dew of night until the following morning, when people use the resulting flower water to wash their faces. Goatsbeard and masterwort are traditionally fashioned into a cross and then are taken to one's local church, where they are blessed by a Christian priest.

Yarrow has been used since ancient times for healing wounds, and its essential oil has anti-inflammatory properties. Yarrow was also used as a ward against evil, and traditionally it was burned on the eve of St John's Day.

Bracken (Pteris aquilina) is sometimes called "brake" or "female fern". The minute spores of this fern were reputed to confer invisibility on their possessor if gathered at the only time when they were said to be visible, i.e., on St. John's Eve at the precise moment at which the saint was born.

In Denmark, the celebration is called sankthans or sankthansaften ("St. John's Eve"). It is the day when the medieval wise men and women would gather special herbs that they needed for the rest of the year to cure people.

In Galicia these herbs are called herbas de San Xoán. Normally seven types of herbs are left all night to dew in a tub of water.

Night on Bald Mountain
Modest Mussorgsky's composition Night on Bald Mountain was originally titled St. John’s Night on the Bare Mountain. The first version appeared in 1867 and was revised around 1872 and again in 1880. In this last version he added a hauntingly beautiful quiet ending; in which a church bell announces the dawn, and daybreak chases away the evil spirit. Night on Bald Mountain has remained an audience favorite ever since its appearance in Walt Disney’s landmark movie, Fantasia.

Food
Customarily, in Connacht, Ireland, a special dish called "Goody" was made. This was white 'shop-bread' which had been soaked in hot milk and flavored with sugar and spices. It was usually made in a large pot that was either placed on the communal bonfire or heated on a smaller fire close by. Revelers brought their own spoons and bowls if they wanted to share in the "Goody".

Traditional celebrations

Brazil

Canada

In Quebec, Canada, the celebration of St John's Day was brought to New France by the first French colonists. Great fires were lit at night. According to the Jesuit Relations, the first celebrations of St John's Day  in New France took place around 1638 on the banks of the Saint Lawrence River on the evening of June 23, 1636 with a bonfire and five cannon shots. In 1908, Pope Pius X designated John the Baptist as the patron saint of the French-Canadians.

Croatia
Croats celebrate "Ivanjske krijesove" on the eve of the Summer Solstice (June 23) with bonfires, honoring St. John the Baptist. Branches are collected and set on fire, while children and young people have to jump over it. Ceremony is also related to water, fertility, and ritual cleansing. In earlier days there was the Slavic custom where girls would throw flower wreaths into the water, and according to the way they float, they would foretell the future.

Denmark
Saint John's Eve (Sankthansaften) is celebrated in the same manner in Denmark as the Walpurgis Night is in Sweden. At dusk large bonfires are lit all over the country, typically accompanied by communal singing of Midsommervisen by Holger Drachmann. Atop each bonfire often an effigy of a witch is placed (harking back to the days of witch trials, when real women were burned at the stake). The origin of this custom is a Danish folk belief that Saint John's Eve is also the night of a witches' meeting on the Brocken, the highest peak in the Harz Mountains in central Germany. 
Traditionally, the bonfires were lit to fend off witches, but today - when the witch effigy catches fire - she is said to be "flying away to Brocken", which can be interpreted as helping the witch on her way. On Saint John's Eve and Saint John's Day, churches arrange Saint John's services and family reunions also occur, which are an occasion for drinking and eating.

England
The feast of St. John the Baptist is one of the quarter days in England. The town of Midsomer Norton, in Somerset, England, is sometimes said to be named after the Feast Day of St John the Baptist, which is also the dedication of the parish church. Wynkyn de Worde (d. 1534) of old England cooked a special soup for the occasion in the manner of his ancestors.

It was the custom in Yorkshire for every family who had come to live in the parish within the last year to put a table outside their house, on St. John's Eve, and place on it bread and cheese and beer and offer this to anyone who passed by. Any of the parish might help themselves and, if the fortunes of the family ran to it, would be invited indoors for a further supper and a festive evening. By this means the newcomers to the parish made many acquaintances and friends, and were helped to see themselves as having a definite place in the local community.

The festival of Golowan in Penzance, Cornwall was created in 1991 to revive the celebration of the Feast of St John. Today it is marked by a torchlit procession, but in the 19th century and earlier the town was the scene of bonfires, burning tar barrels, and homemade fireworks on the principal streets.

Estonia

Estonians celebrate "Jaaniõhtu" on the eve of the Summer Solstice (June 23) with bonfires. On the islands of Saaremaa and Hiiumaa, old fishing boats may be burnt in the large pyres set ablaze. On Jaaniõhtu, Estonians all around the country will gather with their families, or at larger events to celebrate this important day with singing and dancing, as Estonians have done for centuries. The celebrations that accompany Jaaniõhtu carry on usually through the night, they are the largest and most important of the year, and the traditions are almost identical to Finland and similar to neighbours Latvia and Sweden.

Finland

France
In France, the "Fête de la Saint-Jean" (feast of St John), traditionally celebrated with bonfires (le feu de la Saint-Jean) that are reminiscent of Midsummer's pagan rituals, is a Catholic festivity in celebration of Saint John the Baptist. It takes place on June 24, on Midsummer day (St John's day). Nowadays it is seldom celebrated. In certain French towns, a tall bonfire is built by the inhabitants in order to be lit on St John's Day. In the Vosges region and in the Southern part of Meurthe-et-Moselle, this huge bonfire is named "chavande".

Germany
Besides many Midsummernight festivals, the Mainzer Johannisnacht commemorates the person Johannes Gutenberg in his native city since 1968.

Greece
The eve of St John's feast is associated with bonfire jumping, the love/ marriage divination ritual of Klidonas and with picking wild oregano before dawn. St John is also known by the epithets Riganas (the oregano bearer) and Lampadiaris (the bonfire bearer). The practice of bonfires was widespread as late as the 1970s but nowadays survives as a revived folk performance.

Hungary
On June 21 Hungarians celebrate "Saint Ivan's Night" (Szentiván-éj) (Iván was not derived from the Slavic form of John, translated as Jovános, Ivános, Iván in Hungarian). The whole month of June was once called Month of St. Ivan until the 19th century. Setting fires is a folklore tradition this night. Girls jumped over it, while boys watched the spectacle. Most significant among the customs of the summer is lighting the fire of Midsummer Night (szentiváni tűzgyújtás) on the day of St. John (June 24), when the sun follows the highest course, when the nights are the shortest and the days the longest. In the Middle Ages it was primarily an ecclesiastical festivity, but from the 16th century on the sources recall it as a folk custom. The most important episode of the custom is the lighting of the fire.

Ireland
The celebration is also called a "Tine Cnámh", literally Bone Fire. Often lit by the oldest present, the youngest present would throw in a bone as part of the celebrations. As part of some customs after the dancing and celebrations were over, revellers would bring home a spent ember from the fire, this was thrown into a field to bring good fortune in the year to come.

In his poem "The Sisters," published in 1861, Limerick poet Aubrey Thomas de Vere describes "Bonfire Night" or "St. John's Day Eve" in a post-Great-Famine world that still lay in ruins:

At last,After our home attain'd, we turn'd, and lo!With festal fires the hills were lit! Thine eveSaint John, had come once more, and for thy sakeAs though but yesterday thy crown were worn,Amid their ruinous realm uncomfortedThe Irish people triumph'd. Gloomy layThe intermediate space; — thence brightlier burn'dThe circling fires beyond it. 'Lo!' Said I,Man's life as view'd by Ireland's sons; a valeWith many a pitfall throng'd, and shade, and briar,Yet overblown by angel-haunted airs,And by the Light Eternal girdled round."

Irish St. John's Day Eve traditions included: A few days before, children and youth would solicit donations for the bonfires – it was considered bad luck to refuse them. The point of the bonfires was to draw God's blessings on the summer crops. Attendees would leap over the bonfires. Bonfire ashes would be scattered on the crops for good luck. Most troublesome local weeds would be burned in the bonfire to help stave them off. Men would walk through their fields with lit torches and then toss those torches on the bonfire for crop blessing.

People gathering at the bonfires would bring food and drink, with potatoes roasted around the fire. Cattle would be driven through the ashes of the bonfires. At this time of year, St John's Wort and foxgloves would be gathered; the wort was believed to ward off witchcraft and both were used medicinally.

In coastal areas of Ireland, fishermen's boats and nets would be blessed by priests on St John's Eve. A communal salmon dinner was traditionally served on this day in Portballintrae, County Antrim. The sweet milky dish goody was also served, which sometimes would be prepared at the bonfire in a large pot to be served to younger people.

Italy
The feast of Saint John the Baptist has been celebrated in Florence from medieval times, and certainly in the Renaissance, with festivals sometimes lasting three days from 21 to 24 June. Such celebrations are held nowadays in Cesena from 21 to 24 June also with a special street market. Saint John the Baptist is the patron saint of Genoa, Florence and Turin where a fireworks display takes place during the celebration on the river. In Turin Saint John's cult is also well-established since medieval times when the city stops work for two days and people from the surrounding areas gather to dance around the bonfire in the central square. In Genoa and coastal Liguria it is traditional to light bonfires on the beaches on Saint John's Eve to remember the fires lit to celebrate the arrival of Saint John's relics to Genoa in 1098. Since 1391 on the 24th of June a great procession across Genoa carries the relics to the harbour, where the Archbishop blesses the city, the sea, and those who work on it.

Jersey
In Jersey most of the former midsummer customs are largely ignored nowadays. The custom known as Les cônes d'la Saint Jean was observed as late as the 1970s - horns or conch shells were blown. Ringing the bachîn (a large brass preserving pan) at midsummer to frighten away evil spirits survived as a custom on some farms until the 1940s and has been revived as a folk performance in the 21st century.

Latvia

Lithuania

Norway

In Norway, as elsewhere in Scandinavian countries, this event is celebrated with a communal bonfire. The event is also known as Jonsok, meaning "wake of Saint John".

Philippines

In Philippines, the festival is a celebration of thanksgiving done in the traditional “basaan” or dousing of water among children and grown-ups on the streets as a way of sharing the blessings. Parade, street dance competition and other activities liven up the annual celebration.

Poland

In Poland the festival is known as 'noc świętojańska' (Christian) or 'Noc Kupały' (Kupala Night) and 'sobótka' (pagan). Traditional folk rituals include groups of young men and women singing ritual songs to each other. The young women may wear crowns fashioned from wild flowers, which are later thrown into a nearby pond or lake. The boys/young men may then swim out to claim one of the crowns. Bonfires (and bonfire jumping) are also part of the proceedings.

Portugal
There are St John's street parties in many cities, towns and villages, mainly between the evening on the 23rd and the actual St.John's Day on the 24th of June. St John's night in Porto (Festa de São João do Porto) has been described as "one of Europe's liveliest street festivals, yet it is relatively unknown outside" Portugal. The actual Midsummer, St John's day, is celebrated traditionally more in Porto and Braga.

Puerto Rico
On the island of Puerto Rico, which had been named San Juan Bautista, after the saint, by Christopher Columbus, a night-long celebration, called "La Noche de San Juan" is held.  After sunset, people travel to a beach or any accessible body of water (e.g. river, lake or even bathtub) and, at midnight, fall backwards into it three, seven or twelve times.  This is done to cleanse the body from bad luck and give good luck for the following year.

Shetland Isles
The Johnsmas Foy festivities in the Shetland Isles, where the people are still proud of their Nordic roots also take place in the week building up to the 23/24 June.  These may also have their origins in the Scandinavian St John's Eve festivities.

Spain

The traditional midsummer party in Spain is the celebration in honour of Saint John and takes place on the evening of June 23. This midsummer tradition is especially strong in coastal areas of Spain, like in  Galicia, where San Xoán festivals take place all over the region; bonfires are lit and a set of firework displays usually takes place. On the Mediterranean coast, especially in Catalonia and Valencia, bonfires are also traditional and special foods, such as Coca de Sant Joan, are also served on this occasion.  There is also a large festival in Ciutadella, Menorca, along with many other different cities and towns all across Spain having their own unique traditions associated with the festival. 
In Alicante, Bonfires of Saint John are the most important festival, and take place from 20 to 24 June.
Bonfires are also used in the Basque Country to celebrate San Juan Eguna (the feast of St. John the Baptist), which marks the Basque Summer Solstice. In some towns the celebration is supplemented with more festivities and dances.

In Castile and León it is highlighted the Firewalking Festival of San Pedro Manrique (Soria), where barefoot men cross the live coals of a prepared bonfire.

Sweden

This holiday is normally referred to as 'midsummers eve' or Midsommar in Sweden. Originally a pre-Christian tradition, the holiday has during history been influenced by Christian traditions and the celebration of Saint John, but not as much as to it changing name, as in neighbouring Norway and Denmark. A central symbol nowadays is the 'midsummer pole', a maypole that is risen on the same day as midsummers eve. The pole is a high wooden pole covered in leaves and flowers. Participants dance around the pole and sing songs. Other traditions include eating pickled herring with fresh potatoes, often the first from the seasons harvest, served with sourcream and chives, and often accompanied by drinking snaps. It is the biggest holiday of the year in Sweden besides Christmas, and with Sweden being a part of the vodka-belt, getting drunk and feasting all the whole day and night is common.

One Swedish midsummer tradition is that girls should pick seven flowers from seven different fields. The flowers should then be put under the pillow during the midsummer eve night. This night is supposedly magic and the girl is then while sleeping supposed to dream of her future husband.

Another tradition common in Sweden is to make midsummer wreaths of flowers.

United States
Historically, this date has been venerated in the practice of Louisiana Voodoo.  The famous Voodoo priestess Marie Laveau was said to have held ceremonies on the Bayou St. John, in New Orleans, commemorating St John's Eve. Many New Orleans residents still keep the tradition alive.

See also

 Golowan
 Midsummer
 Nativity of St John the Baptist
 St. John's Day
 St. John's Day, Masonic feast
 St. John's Eve, a short story by Gogol
 St Mark's Eve
 True and Untrue

References

External links
 
 The Nativity of John the Baptist: The Midsummer Nativity
 Saint John's Eve - Evangelical Lutheran Church in Denmark 
 St. John's Eve Bonfire - Catholic Culture
  A poem by Letitia Elizabeth Landon (1822).

Eve
Áine